Madison Township is one of the twelve townships of Sandusky County, Ohio, United States.  As of the 2000 census, 3,721 people lived in the township, 1,215 of whom lived in the unincorporated portions of the township.

Geography
Located in the western part of the county, it borders the following townships:
Woodville Township - north
Washington Township - east
Jackson Township - southeast corner
Scott Township - south
Montgomery Township, Wood County - southwest corner
Freedom Township, Wood County - west

Most of the village of Gibsonburg is located in eastern Madison Township, with the unincorporated community of Rollersville straddling the southern border with Scott Township.

Name and history
Madison Township was named for President James Madison.

It is one of twenty Madison Townships statewide.

Government
The township is governed by a three-member board of trustees, who are elected in November of odd-numbered years to a four-year term beginning on the following January 1. Two are elected in the year after the presidential election and one is elected in the year before it. There is also an elected township fiscal officer, who serves a four-year term beginning on April 1 of the year after the election, which is held in November of the year before the presidential election. Vacancies in the fiscal officership or on the board of trustees are filled by the remaining trustees.

References

External links
County website

Townships in Sandusky County, Ohio
Townships in Ohio